Robert Thomas Roberts (18 February 1912 – September 1979) was an English professional rugby league footballer who played in the 1930s and 1940s.

Background
Bob Roberts' birth was registered in  Prescot district, Lancashire, England, he was living in Gartons Lane, St. Helens and working as a clerk at a weighbridge , and he died aged 67 in St. Helens, Merseyside, England.

Playing career

International honours
Roberts won caps for England while at Widnes in 1939 against Wales, and in 1940 against Wales.

Championship final appearances
Roberts played in Widnes' 2-21 defeat by Hull F.C. in the Championship Final during the 1935–36 season.

Challenge Cup Final appearances
Roberts played in Widnes' 18-5 victory over Keighley in the 1936–37 Challenge Cup Final during the 1936–37 season at Wembley Stadium, London on Saturday 8 May 1937.

County Cup Final appearances
Roberts played  in Widnes' 4-5 defeat by Swinton in the 1939–40 Lancashire County Cup Final first-leg during the 1939–40 season at Naughton Park, Widnes on Saturday 20 April 1940, and played right-, i.e. number 12, in the 11-16 defeat (15-21 aggregate defeat) by Swinton in the 1939–40 Lancashire County Cup Final second-leg during the 1939–40 season at Station Road, Swinton on Saturday 27 April 1940, and played left-, i.e. number 11, in Widnes' 7-3 victory over Wigan in the 1945–46 Lancashire County Cup Final during the 1945–46 season at Wilderspool Stadium, Warrington on Saturday 27 October 1945.

Club career
Roberts made his début for Widnes as a  against Barrow at Craven Park, Barrow-in-Furness on Monday 17 April 1933, and he played his last match for Widnes against Bradford Northern at Odsal Stadium, Bradford on Saturday 27 September 1947, he left Widnes for St. Helens for £800/£1000 (based on increases in average earnings, this would be approximately £71,110/£88,887 in 2013),
and he made his début for St. Helens in the 24-3 victory over Swinton at Knowsley Road, St. Helens on Saturday 4 October 1947, and he played his last match for St. Helens in the 10-12 defeat by Keighley at Lawkholme Lane, Keighley on Saturday 23 October 1948.

References

External links
Statistics at rugby.widnes.tv
Profile at saints.org.uk

1912 births
1979 deaths
England national rugby league team players
English rugby league players
Rugby league centres
Rugby league hookers
Rugby league locks
Rugby league players from Prescot
Rugby league props
Rugby league second-rows
St Helens R.F.C. players
Widnes Vikings players